Acetothermus is a genus in the phylum Bacteroidota (Bacteria).

Etymology
The name Acetothermus derives from:Latin noun acetum, vinegar; Greek adjective thermos (θερμός), hot; New Latin masculine gender noun Acetothermus, a thermophilic microorganism producing acetic acid.

Species
The genus contains  single species, namely A. paucivorans ( Dietrich et al. 1988,  (Type species of the genus).; Latin adjective paucus, few, little; Latin participle adjective vorans, eating, devouring; N.L participle adjective paucivorans, eating little (utilizing only a very restricted number of the supplied substrates).)

See also
 Bacterial taxonomy
 Microbiology

References 

Bacteria genera
Bacteroidia
Monotypic bacteria genera